Grant Township is a township in Winnebago County, Iowa, in the USA.

History
Grant Township was established in 1886. It was named for Ulysses S. Grant.

References

Townships in Winnebago County, Iowa
Townships in Iowa
1886 establishments in Iowa